Acrocercops largoplaga is a moth of the family Gracillariidae. It is known from the Seychelles.

References

largoplaga
Moths of Africa
Moths described in 1965
Insects of Seychelles